Catoptria satakei is a moth in the family Crambidae. It was described by Okano in 1962. It is found in Japan (Hokkaido).

References

Crambini
Moths described in 1962
Moths of Japan